The 2021–22 OFI Crete F.C. season was the club's 97th season in existence and the fourth consecutive season in the top flight of Greek football. In addition to the domestic league, OFI participated in this season's edition of the Greek Football Cup. The season covered the period from 1 July 2021 to 30 June 2022.

Players

First-team squad

Transfers

Pre-season and friendlies

Competitions

Overview

Super League 1

League table

Results summary

Results by matchday

Matches

Play out round

Results summary

Results by matchday

Matches

Greek Football Cup

Fifth Round

Round of 16

References

OFI Crete F.C. seasons
OFI